Three Sevens is a 1921 American silent drama film directed by Chester Bennett and starring Antonio Moreno, Jean Calhoun and Emmett King.

Cast
 Antonio Moreno as Daniel Craig
 Jean Calhoun as Joan Gracie
 Emmett King as Major Jerome Gracie
 Geoffrey Webb as Gary Lee
 DeWitt Jennings as Samuel Green
 Starke Patteson as Brewster Green
 Beatrice Burnham as Amy Green

References

Bibliography
 Munden, Kenneth White. The American Film Institute Catalog of Motion Pictures Produced in the United States, Part 1. University of California Press, 1997.

External links
 

1921 films
1921 drama films
1920s English-language films
American silent feature films
Silent American drama films
American black-and-white films
Films directed by Chester Bennett
Vitagraph Studios films
1920s American films